Operation Ceinture was a late 1947 military endeavour by the French Far East Expeditionary Corps against the Viet Minh during the First Indochina War. A month-long effort that commenced on 20 November following the cessation of Operation Léa, Ceinture (French: belt) intended to rid the region between Hanoi, Thái Nguyên and Tuyên Quang of Viet-Minh infiltration. The French utilised 18 paratroop battalions and naval landing craft to engage the Viet-Minh's 112 Regiment, however the latter were able to for the most part slip through French cordons, abandoning weapon caches. The cumulative casualties after Operation Ceinture and Operation Lea were 1,000 for the French and 9,500 for the Viet Minh (though some of these may have been civilians).

The French did succeed in securing the region, and they withdrew their forces on 22 December, leaving a scattering of jungle fortifications to hold the region.

Notes

References
Printed
 
 
 
 
 
 
 
 
 

1947 in French Indochina
1947 in Vietnam
Battles and operations of the First Indochina War
Military operations involving France
Battles involving Vietnam
Conflicts in 1947
History of Hanoi
November 1947 events in Asia
December 1947 events in Asia
20th century in Hanoi
History of Tuyên Quang Province
History of Thái Nguyên Province